The 2015 Vuelta a España was a three-week Grand Tour cycling race that took place principally in Spain between 22 August and 13 September 2015; two stages also took place partly or wholly in Andorra. The first ten stages took the race from Spain's southern Mediterranean coast to Castellón de la Plana on the eastern coast.

Stage 1 was a team time trial that took place around the Costa del Sol beach resort of Marbella on 22 August. The day before the stage took place, its route was deemed to be dangerous by the race commissaires; the times did not therefore count for the general classification and several teams rode the stage slowly. The second stage was therefore the first whose times counted; it was the first of nine summit finishes in the Vuelta and was won by Esteban Chaves, who took the leader's red jersey. Stages 3, 4 and 5 were hilly sprint stages, won by Peter Sagan, Alejandro Valverde and Caleb Ewan respectively. Tom Dumoulin took the red jersey after the fifth stage because of a split in the peloton at the finish line.

The race returned to the mountains on stage 6 with a third-category summit finish. This was again won by Chaves, who therefore regained the race lead. He retained this the following day on the first first-category summit finish of the race. This was won by riders from a breakaway; the significant general classification changes were the several seconds won by Fabio Aru and the time lost by Chris Froome, the winner of the 2015 Tour de France. Another hilly stage followed: this was won by Jasper Stuyven from a sprint, despite breaking his scaphoid earlier in the stage. Several other riders crashed during the stage, including Sagan, who was hit by a race motorbike. The ninth stage was the first before the Vuelta's first rest day and was another first-category summit finish. It was won by Dumoulin just ahead of Froome; Dumoulin took back the red jersey.

After a transfer to Andorra and the rest day, the riders took on a very difficult stage at the beginning of the second week. This involved six categorised climbs in just  of racing, with very little flat road between them. The stage was won by Mikel Landa, with his teammate Fabio Aru moving into the race lead and Rodríguez moving into second, with Dumoulin third. Chris Froome, who had crashed at the very beginning of the stage and ridden the rest of it with a broken foot, withdrew from the race the following morning.

Classification standings

Stage 1 
22 August 2015 — Puerto Banús to Marbella,  (TTT)

The first stage was a flat,  team time trial along the sea front from Puerto Banús to Marbella. It was scheduled to take place in the evening, with the first team starting at 18:40 and the last team expected to finish at 20:33. Two days before the stage, several riders arrived at the course and raised concerns about safety. Their concerns included the seven changes in road surface, ramps, a section on a rubber mat on the beach and a raised bridge section. Following a meeting between the race organisers, the Union Cycliste Internationale (UCI) and the riders' union, it was decided to use the original route but to neutralise the stage for the general classification. The teams would, however, race for stage victory and the times would count for the team classification.

This was soon beaten by the next team to start, who went 22" quicker. Their lead lasted until the eleventh team to start, beat them by 7" to move into the lead.  put in a strong ride but were 11" behind .  then moved into the lead by less than a second.  then beat this time – again by less than a second.

Peter Velits was the first BMC rider to cross the finish line and was therefore awarded the red jersey as the leader of the race, although all the 198 riders were on the same time. He attributed the team's victory to the tactic of sacrificing several riders who rode very hard at the beginning of the stage, while the remaining riders held on to set the time. Velits had previous success in the Vuelta: he finished on the podium of the 2010 edition. Vincenzo Nibali (Astana) explained after the stage that his team had not attempted to win the stage because it was "quite dangerous" and there were "a lot of vibrations from the different surfaces", with additional difficulty coming from the time trial bikes.

Stage 2 
23 August 2015 — Alhaurín de la Torre to Caminito del Rey, 

The second stage was a  route that included the first summit finish of the race. Most of the stage was fairly flat, with only the third-category Alto de Ardales after  providing any significant difficulty ( at 4.4%). The finish of the stage, however, was on the third-category Alto de la Mesa. The stage finished near the Caminito del Rey, one of the most famous sights in Málaga.

The first crash of the Vuelta came after just  of racing: Matteo Pelucchi was riding at the back of the peloton and crashed on a corner as Movistar rode hard at the front. He suffered abrasions and road rash and was forced to abandon the race. A breakaway escaped approximately  later. It was formed of Nelson Oliveira, Davide Villella, Walter Pedraza, Bert-Jan Lindeman, José Gonçalves and Matteo Montaguti. Although the six riders were unable to build a significant lead, they did lead over the first climb of the day; Pedraza won the mountain points at the top of the Vuelta's first climb. At this point, the break's lead was about one minute.

With  remaining, however, there was a large crash in the peloton, delaying a large number of riders. Vincenzo Nibali and Fabio Aru (both ) were among the riders caught up in the crash. Aru was quickly given a bike and was soon with the main peloton, but Nibali waited a long time before Giuseppe Martinelli provided him with a new bike. Nibali was then forced to make a long chase to return to the peloton. Another Astana rider, Paolo Tiralongo also crashed and was seen after the incident bleeding from his head. After the team lost Pelucchi early in the day, 's David Tanner was also caught in the crash and suffered a broken pelvis.

On the climb to the finish, Cyril Gautier was the first to attack, but was soon caught by Nairo Quintana (Movistar), who was in a group with Nicolas Roche (Sky) and Tom Dumoulin. After work from his team, Esteban Chaves attacked and bridged across to the leading three riders. Chaves soon dropped Quintana from the group and, despite an attack from Roche in the final , took the stage victory. This was his first ever Grand Tour stage victory and gave him the leader's jersey. Dumoulin was second on the stage with Roche third. Dan Martin was fourth, 14" back, with Joaquim Rodríguez and Quintana a further 12" behind. Chris Froome (Sky) and Alejandro Valverde (Movistar) came in together 30" behind Chaves, with Aru and all the other contenders further behind. As well as taking the overall lead of the race, Chaves also took the lead in the other three classifications (the points classification, the mountains classification and the combination classification).

After the stage, a video emerged of Nibali holding onto his team car as it accelerated away from a group of riders that had been caught up in the crash. The acceleration helped Nibali to rejoin the peloton ahead of the final climb. As a result of the incident, the race jury disqualified Nibali from the race, describing the situation as "really clear". One of the team's directeurs sportifs, Alexander Shefer, was also excluded from taking further part in the race. Nibali apologised for the incident after the race, but also expressed his frustration at having been abandoned by his team.

Stage 3 
24 August 2015 — Mijas to Málaga, 

The third stage of the race was a mixed,  route from Mijas to Málaga. After  of flat roads at the start, there was the third-category Alto de Mijas ( at 7%). Following a long descent, there were  more flat roads, before the first-category Puerto del León ( at 5.2%). More flat roads followed as the riders approached Málaga along the coast, though there were more small hills in the final .

A breakaway was formed early into the day, without significant chasing. It included eight riders: Natnael Berhane (MTN-Qhubeka), Sylvain Chavanel (IAM), Omar Fraile (Caja Rural), Walter Pedraza (Colombia), Martin Velits (Etixx-Quick Step), Alexis Gougeard, Ilia Koshevoy (Lampre-Merida) and Maarten Tjallingii (LottoNL-Jumbo). They had a three-minute lead over the peloton as they crossed the Alto de Mijas, with Fraile taking the mountains points. The first significant incident of the day was Paolo Tiralongo's abandoning the race; he had failed to recover from the crash on stage 2. Fraile also won the second mountain sprint of the day on the Puerto del León to take the lead of the mountains classification.

Despite the exposed course of the race, there were no significant winds and the most notable incident was the crash of Nacer Bouhanni in the main peloton. Bouhanni was assisted in getting back to the peloton by a "sticky bottle", where his directeur sportif handed him a bottle of water; handing the bottle over took twelve seconds, during which time the team car accelerated, helping Bouhanni in his chase. The incident drew comparisons with the one that had led to Nibali's disqualification the previous day; Bouhanni, however, was fined .

After the intermediate sprint – won by Chavanel – the breakaway broke up, with Tjallingii and Gougeard continuing in the lead; at one point they were 1' 40" ahead of the chasing peloton. The peloton was controlled by Tinkoff-Saxo (riding for Peter Sagan) and Giant-Alpecin (riding for John Degenkolb). The combined pressure of these teams caused Caleb Ewan to be dropped and the breakaway was caught soon afterwards. Giant-Alpecin led out the sprint, but Sagan and Bouhanni were able to come around Degenkolb and Sagan took the stage victory. The victory was Sagan's first in a Grand Tour in over two years, since stage 7 of the 2013 Tour de France.

Stage 4 
25 August 2015 — Estepona to Vejer de la Frontera, 

The fourth stage was a  route from Estepona to Vejer de la Frontera. The route did not include any categorised climbs. However, it was not expected to suit the sprinters, because there was a sharp incline in the closing part of the stage. With  remaining, there was a  section at approximately 13%, followed by a flatter section, a short descent and then another incline to the line. The roads used were narrow and twisting; the finale was expected to suit the puncheurs.

The breakaway was again swift to form in the early part of the stage. It included six riders: Mickaël Delage, Bert-Jan Lindeman (LottoNL-Jumbo), Nikolas Maes (Etixx-Quick Step), Jimmy Engoulvent (Europcar), Kristijan Đurasek (Lampre-Merida) and Markel Irizar (Trek Factory Racing). Their lead extended to thirteen minutes early in the stage, but it was quickly cut down by  along with Movistar and Katusha, to around seven minutes at the halfway point of the stage.  joined the chase in the second half of the stage and the lead was gradually reduced.

The most significant moment during the chase came  from the finish, when several riders fell on a tight corner. These included Tejay van Garderen (BMC), who was helped to return to the peloton by his teammates. Another rider caught up in the incident was Ben King, who stood by the side of the road waiting for his team to bring him a new bike. While he was waiting, one spectator stole his bicycle computer and another attempted to ride off on his bike, although a mechanical problem stopped him.

Engoulvent and Irizar attacked from the breakaway and gained a 30-second lead, but they were caught by the peloton before the ascent in the final kilometres. He was caught  later, at which point Samuel Sánchez (BMC) and Nicolas Roche attacked. They initially had a significant lead, but the incline in the final part of the stage allowed the peloton to come back to them. Sánchez was caught first, with Roche caught in the final . Alejandro Valverde won the stage, with Sagan second and Daniel Moreno third. Roche held on for fourth place on the stage. The stage was the ninth Vuelta stage victory of Valverde's career.

Chaves retained his red jersey and the white jersey of the combination classification, but Sagan took over the lead of the points classification.

Stage 5 
26 August 2015 — Rota to Alcalá de Guadaíra, 

The fifth stage was another fairly flat stage: a  route from Rota to Alcalá de Guadaíra. Cyclingnews.com described it as "on paper, ... the most straightforward stage of the race". The first part of the course was along the coast, before turning inland towards Jerez de la Frontera then north towards the finish. There was a slight gradient in the final . The principal difficulty in the stage was expected to be the heat, with crosswinds also a possibility.

The stage started with a solo attack from Tsgabu Grmay. After  of racing, Iljo Keisse and Antoine Duchesne joined him to form a three-man breakaway. The three riders gained a lead of over seven minutes; Giant-Alpecin and Tinkoff-Saxo then began to control the front of the peloton and reduce the breakaway's advantage; with  remaining, Grmay, Keisse and Duchesne had a lead of about five minutes. This was reduced further when Cofidis began to assist in the chase in support of Bouhanni. The breakaway broke up after Grmay stopped contributing to the group's effort: Keisse was visibly annoyed at him, then attacked and went off in a solo move. Grmay and Duchesne were first to be caught; Keisse was then brought back by the peloton inside the final .

The peloton rode hard on the flat roads approaching the incline at the finish. Astana, Tinkoff-Saxo, Sky and Katusha all contributed at the front of the group before the sprinters' teams took over. MTN-Qhubeka was the first of these, while Cofidis were unable to position Bouhanni correctly. , who had not been involved in the chase for most of the stage, came to the front for the final section, with its several tight corners. Degenkolb was the first to open the sprint with Sagan on his wheel, but 's Caleb Ewan was able to come past both of them to take the stage victory. Degenkolb was second and Sagan third. The stage was Ewan's first Grand Tour stage victory: the Vuelta was his first Grand Tour and came in the first year of his professional career.

There were several splits in the peloton at the finish. Fourteen riders – including Chris Froome, Tom Dumoulin, Samuel Sánchez and Rafał Majka – finished two seconds behind Ewan, with most of the other general classification riders – including Chaves, Valverde, Rodríguez and Aru – a further six seconds back. Dumoulin therefore took over the race lead from Chaves by one second; Chaves retained his lead of the combination classification.

Stage 6 
27 August 2015 — Córdoba to Sierra de Cazorla, 

The sixth stage was a  route from Córdoba to Sierra de Cazorla. The route was consistently undulating, with small hills throughout the first two-thirds. The final third was the most difficult and included two third-category climbs. Another undulating section was followed by a descent and then a long climb to the finish. The road climbed consistently for around  before a short descent and then the climb to the summit finish, the Alto de Cazorla.

The day's breakaway took a long time to form. Various riders attacked, but the peloton brought back all the moves for the first  of racing. Eventually a five-rider breakaway was allowed to form, composed of Steve Cummings (MTN-Qhubeka), Peter Velits (BMC), Kristijan Đurasek (Lampre-Merida), Niki Terpstra (Etixx-Quick Step), and Cyril Gautier (Europcar), and they were soon joined by Miguel Ángel Rubiano (Colombia). The six riders gained a lead of over four minutes, but it was already being brought back by the peloton by the time they reached the Alto de Baeza, where Gautier was the first rider to the summit. Giant-Alpecin (on behalf of Dumoulin) and Movistar controlled the pace at the front of the peloton. With  remaining, as the roads began to go uphill, the lead was under a minute. Terpstra was the only rider from the breakaway to chase him; the other riders sat up and were caught by the peloton.

Cummings's lead was slowly reduced by the peloton; he only had a small lead when the categorised portion of the climb started in the final . Esteban Chaves, who was one second behind Dumoulin going into the stage, attacked the peloton with  remaining as the roads reached a gradient of 15%. Chaves said after the stage that he was worried that he had attacked too soon and would not be able to keep a lead to the top of the climb. He quickly caught and passed Cummings. When the gradient eased with  remaining, Dumoulin counter-attacked to try to defend his red jersey. Other attacks came from Dan Martin and from Nicolas Roche, but they were unable to catch Chaves, who held on to take the stage victory. Martin finished second, five seconds behind Chaves, with Dumoulin on the same time. A large group, including all the general classification favourites, finished six seconds further back.

With the aid of the time bonuses, he moved into a ten-second lead ahead of Dumoulin and took back the red jersey. He also retained the white jersey of the combination classification. Martin moved into third place overall, 33 seconds behind Chaves. Alejandro Valverde said after the stage that he now considered Chaves a "big rival" for the overall victory.

Stage 7 
28 August 2015 — Jódar to La Alpujarra, 

The seventh stage included the most significant summit finish of the race so far. The route started in Jódar and travelled  to La Alpujarra. The route was generally south, looping around the western part of the Sierra Nevada and finishing on the edge of the mountain range. The roads were up and down all day, though there were only two categorised climbs. The first of these was the Puerto de los Blancares ( at 3.3%), the summit of which came after . The next  also followed roads that consistently went up and down, with very few flat sections. The final climb started  before the finish line and had an average gradient of 5%. This was the Alto de Capileira, which was rated as a first-category climb.

The breakaway was quick to form, with five riders going on the attack. These were Carlos Quintero (Colombia), Amets Txurruka (Caja Rural), Ilia Koshevoy (Lampre-Merida), Bert-Jan Lindeman (LottoNL-Jumbo) and Jérôme Cousin (Europcar). The teams in the peloton, especially , were not willing to expend significant effort and the gap was nearly eight minutes after  of racing. This increased further and at one point exceeded thirteen minutes. Shortly after this, however, work from Movistar began to reduce the advantage. A large number of riders were dropped from the peloton under Movistar's pressure and the gap fell to five minutes. The pressure continued until the flat section midway up the climb; here their pressure eased and Astana began to take responsibility for the chase.

Cousin was the first of the riders in the breakaway to attack. Txurruka brought him back, but the acceleration was too much for Quintero, who was dropped from the break. Koshevoy then attacked several times; he dropped Txurruka, but Cousin and Lindeman were able to follow him and the breakaway was reduced to three riders. It was reduced further when there was a collision in the final  between Cousin and Koshevoy; Koshevoy was able to continue, but Cousin was dropped from the break. Lindeman attacked with about  remaining to the finish and took the victory by nine seconds. The victory was Lindeman's first World Tour victory.

In the main peloton, Dan Martin was the first to attack, but he was quickly brought back by a group of riders. A significant attack then came from Fabio Aru, who immediately won a gap ahead of the other riders in the group. Aru went past Cousin and finished the stage third, 29" behind Lindeman. The main group of general classification riders came in seven seconds behind Aru. Aru's attack, however, had dropped a large number of riders from the group, including Chris Froome, Mikel Landa and Tejay van Garderen. Froome fell out of the top ten. Chaves, however, finished in the main group and retained his lead in the general classification. His sixth-place finish also won him enough points to move into the lead of the points classification. Aru moved up two places into eighth; Domenico Pozzovivo also entered the top ten.

Stage 8 
29 August 2015 — Puebla de Don Fadrique to Murcia, 

The first  of the stage were generally downhill. This was followed by a section of flat roads before the riders arrived in Murcia. After passing through an intermediate sprint, the riders left the town for two laps of an  circuit. The stage was expected to be too difficult for the sprinters.

The stage's early breakaway was formed of six riders: Alex Howes (Cannondale-Garmin), Iljo Keisse (Etixx-Quick-Step), Jimmy Engoulvent (Europcar), Tom Van Asbroeck (LottoNL-Jumbo), Jasper De Buyst (Lotto-Soudal), and Ángel Madrazo (Colombia). They built a lead of nearly five minutes, but Giant-Alpecin and Tinkoff-Saxo controlled their advantage throughout. The first major incident of the day was a crash that came  from the finish line, as the peloton approached the first of the day's climbs. This involved more than twenty riders. Four riders were forced to withdraw from the race: Tejay van Garderen (BMC), Dan Martin (Cannondale-Garmin), Kris Boeckmans (Lotto-Soudal) and Nacer Bouhanni (Cofidis). Van Garderen suffered a broken shoulder and Martin a broken clavicle. Boeckmans had been at the origin of the crash: he was drinking from a bidon when he hit a hole in the road and fell hard to the ground. He suffered a range of injuries, including facial trauma and fractures, a concussion, broken ribs and a pneumothorax; he was taken to hospital and placed in an induced coma. He remained in the coma for over a week; he left hospital several weeks later following major facial surgery. Among the other riders delayed in the crash were Chaves, the race leader, and Jasper Stuyven.

The breakaway's lead was reduced to less than two minutes at the foot of the first climb. Howes attacked alone, with Madrazo following. On the descent, however, Howes fell. He was passed by Madrazo and by the peloton, which had caught the remainder of the breakaway. On the flat section that followed the climb, several groups, including that of Chaves, came back together. Niki Terpstra (Etixx-Quick Step) attacked, but was soon caught and passed by his teammate Gianluca Brambilla, who was part of a four-man group that formed on the final ascent of the day. Tom Dumoulin attempted to control the peloton on the climb, but there were attacks from various riders including some of the general classification favourites. After the descent, the groups came back together and the lead group was formed of approximately 40 riders.

Another breakaway was then formed by José Gonçalves, Kenny Elissonde (FDJ) and Alberto Losada (Katusha); although they gained a lead of nearly 20 seconds, they were brought back by Trek and Tinkoff-Saxo. With  remaining, there was another crash. This involved Peter Sagan, who was hit from behind by a motorbike belonging to the Shimano neutral service team and knocked to the ground with leg injuries. Following the incident, Sagan gestured towards the motorbike and appeared to kick his own bike and to punch the medical car. He was dropped from the lead group and was unable to contest the sprint.

One last attack came from Adam Hansen (Lotto-Soudal) with  remaining, but he was unable to escape the bunch. The stage therefore came down to a sprint, which was won by Jasper Stuyven, with Pello Bilbao second and Kévin Reza (FDJ) third. This was the first win of Stuyven's professional career. Except for Dan Martin's withdrawal, there were no significant changes to the standings in the general classification.

Following the stage, however, it was announced by Trek Factory Racing that Stuyven had suffered a broken scaphoid in the first major crash and he was forced to withdraw from the race. Sagan was also forced to abandon the Vuelta after the stage, as he had suffered cuts and burns on his left side and a contusion in his left arm. Sagan was also fined  for his behaviour following the crash, while the rider of the motorbike was excluded from the remainder of the Vuelta.

Stage 9 
30 August 2015 — Torrevieja to Cumbre del Sol, Benitachell, 

The first  of the stage were fairly straightforward, with no significant climbs. After this, however, the riders entered a complex sequence of roads around the finishing town. They then returned to the same roads that they had used earlier, but continued for the full length of the climb ( at 8.9%). The climb was expected to suit the punchy climbers.

The early breakaway included fourteen riders. These were Alexis Gougeard, Nikolas Maes, Pieter Serry and Maxime Bouet (all Etixx-Quick Step), Geraint Thomas (Sky), Lorenzo Manzin (FDJ), Mattia Cattaneo (Lampre-Merida), Yoann Bagot (Cofidis), Maarten Tjallingii (LottoNL-Jumbo), Omar Fraile (Caja Rural), Tony Hurel (Europcar), Danny van Poppel (Trek Factory Racing), Pavel Brutt (Tinkoff-Saxo) and Songezo Jim (MTN-Qhubeka). The breakaway's lead was over five minutes at one point, but was gradually reduced as the peloton approached the final climb of the day; Katusha did most of the work through the day on behalf of Joaquim Rodríguez.

The breakaway was eventually caught at the bottom of the final climb. Valverde, who had crashed earlier in the day, was the first to attack. As soon as he was caught, his teammate Nairo Quintana put in his own attack. These attacks dropped Chris Froome from the front group. Dumoulin was the next to attack, seeking to take back the race lead from Chaves. Chaves and Quintana initially followed him, but were soon dropped. Valverde was also unable to follow the pace, but Froome had kept a steady pace and by this point was leading the chase of Dumoulin.

As soon as the two riders caught Dumoulin, Froome attacked again and briefly held the lead. Dumoulin was stronger in the final, steep . He caught Froome and came around to take the stage win and the race lead, finishing 2" ahead of Froome. Rodríguez was a further 3" behind, with significant time gaps to the other general classification riders. Chaves finished in fifteenth place, nearly a minute behind Dumoulin, and fell to third on the general classification.

Stage 10 
31 August 2015 — Valencia to Castellón de la Plana, 

The tenth stage was the final one before the first rest day. The stage again travelled north between two coastal towns; this stage, however, took an inland, hillier route. The first of the day's two climbs was the third-category  ( at 4.4%). After the descent from the climb, there were more hilly roads before another descent to sea level. This was the second-category  ( at 5.6%). The stage was expected to suit the sprinters.

The breakaway took some time to form; on the first climb of the day, a group of 40 riders went clear, including at least one rider from every team in the race. The group was never allowed to get clear, with Giant-Alpecin and Movistar determined to set up the stage victory for their sprinters. The breakaway's lead was consistently around one minute, with various riders dropping back to the main group and others attacking. The breakaway was caught with  remaining in the stage. Niki Terpstra attacked, as he had done on several other stages, but was not able to escape the peloton, which came into the final climb together. Nicolas Roche (Sky) was involved in a crash on a roundabout and received treatment from the medical car as his teammates helped him back into the main pack.

There were several attacks on the climb. The first of these came from Alessandro De Marchi (BMC), with Romain Sicard (Europcar) following him. A second attack came from Kenny Elissonde (FDJ) and Jérôme Coppel. Elissonde caught and passed Sicard and De Marchi and set off alone. Another attack came from Gianluca Brambilla (Etixx-Quick Step), while Dumoulin himself was leading the peloton in order to defend his race lead and set up the sprint for Degenkolb, his teammate. De Marchi and Sicard caught Elissonde at the top of the climb, where they were around 30" ahead of the peloton. Sergio Henao (Sky) who had suffered a puncture before the climb and was riding hard to get back into the peloton, crashed on the descent and lost his bike over the side of the road; he lost several minutes and fell from fourteenth place overall to twenty-sixth.

At the foot of the climb, the leading group only had a small advantage over the peloton and were soon caught. There were no lead-out trains in the final kilometres, with fewer than 60 riders left in the group. Tosh Van der Sande (Lotto-Soudal) was the first to sprint, but Kristian Sbaragli (MTN-Qhubeka) came past him and took the stage victory. Degenkolb was the quickest in the final metres, but he had been badly positioned and was only able to finish second. José Joaquín Rojas (Movistar) finished third. The stage was Sbaragli's first win in over two years. It was the second win of his career and the first in a Grand Tour.

Stage 11 
2 September 2015 — Andorra la Vella to Cortals d'Encamp, 

The eleventh stage came after the first rest day of the Vuelta and a transfer to Andorra la Vella. Although a short stage at just , it was very difficult, with six categorised climbs and few flat roads. It started in Andorra la Vella and immediately climbed the first-category Collada de Beixalis ( at 8.7%). After the descent and some false flat, the riders climbed the first-category Coll D'Ordino ( at 7%), followed by another long descent past Andorra la Vella and onto the next first-category climb, the Coll de la Rabassa ( at 6.6%). Following the descent, the riders climbed the hardest climb of the day, the -category Collada de la Gallina ( at 8.5%). After the descent, the riders once again went past Andorra la Vella (this time climbing the second-category Alto de la Cormella on the way) to reach the foot of the final climb. The stage was designed by Joaquim Rodríguez; before the stage, he described it as "dramatic". The manager of Movistar, Eusebio Unzué, described it as "the toughest Vuelta stage that he has seen in more than 30 years". Javier Guillén, the race director, agreed, describing it as "possibly the hardest stage we have ever put together in terms of the amount of climbing involved".

The first significant moment came in the approach to the Collada de Beixalis, the first climb of the day. Chris Froome hit a wooden barrier and then a wall, injuring his left shoulder and knee and his right foot. He was dropped from the lead group and, with the help of teammates, started a long chase back to the leading group. The first riders to attack were Romain Sicard (Europcar) and Darwin Atapuma (BMC); they were followed by seventeen other riders, including Fraile, the leader of the mountains classification. They led over the summit of the climb, with Fraile the first over the summit to extend his lead in the classification. Froome regained contact with the main group on the descent from the climb.

There was another significant incident at the bottom of the first climb. This involved Sérgio Paulinho (Tinkoff-Saxo): he collided with a race motorbike, causing significant cuts to his leg. Paulinho first attempted to continue riding; he was then treated by the race doctor, who put staples in his leg. He lay down on the road for treatment. Although he attempted to continue riding, he was forced to withdraw from the race just before the summit of the climb; he then went to hospital and received seventeen stitches. Paulinho's teammate Peter Sagan had also been hit by a motorbike on stage 8 and the team had issued a statement calling for an apology from the race organisers and measures to prevent such incidents. Following Paulinho's incident, Oleg Tinkov, the team's owner, suggested on Twitter that the team may withdraw from the race; a statement from the team after the stage said, "the team will consider whether it is safe to continue racing under the current arrangements".

Rubén Plaza (Lampre-Merida) led the breakaway over the second climb of the day, with Fraile second. The breakaway was around two minutes ahead of the peloton. Imanol Erviti (Movistar) attacked on the descent and led the race solo for some distance; he was first to reach the summit of the next climb, the Coll de la Rabassa, with Fraile again second. He was eventually brought back by work from Mikel Landa (Astana) on the descent. On the Coll de la Gallina the breakaway broke up: the lead group was formed of Landa and Fraile, along with Ian Boswell (Sky), Romain Sicard (Europcar), Nelson Oliveira (Lampre-Merida), Darwin Atapuma (BMC) and Paweł Poljański (Tinkoff-Saxo). Fraile was first over the summit. The climb also caused difficulty in the main group: Chris Froome was unable to stay in the group; his injured shoulder was treated at the medical car and he was then guided through the rest of the stage by Geraint Thomas. Froome lost two minutes on the climb. Nicolas Roche was also dropped from the lead group and Mikel Nieve took over the leadership of Team Sky.

On the descent, Valverde and Rodríguez attacked and were joined by teammates from the breakaway. They had a 40-second advantage over a group containing Dumoulin and Fabio Aru. Aru's teammate Dario Cataldo was able to bring him back to Valverde and Rodríguez; Dumoulin was then also able to return to the group.

Landa attacked the breakaway at the bottom of the final climb, while Aru attacked the group of favourites at approximately the same point. Aru was followed by Valverde and Rodríguez, but another attack  from the finish left him alone. Landa, meanwhile, had taken his team radio earpiece out and was ignoring instructions from his team to drop back and assist Aru. Landa rode alone to the top of the climb and took the stage victory. Aru caught and passed Ian Boswell – the only other rider remaining from the breakaway – and finished the stage 1' 22" behind Landa. Boswell took third place, while Rodríguez was the first of Aru's general classification rivals to finish, 37" behind him. Tom Dumoulin and Esteban Chaves finished together, losing nearly two minutes. Aru therefore took the lead of the general classification, 27" ahead of Rodríguez, with Dumoulin 3" further back in third. Quintana was also dropped on the climb, losing nearly three minutes to Aru, and fell to ninth on the general classification; he later revealed that he had been suffering from a fever. Froome, meanwhile, finished nearly nine minutes down and struggled to put weight on his foot after the stage. An MRI scan revealed a break in his foot and he withdrew from the Vuelta the following morning.

References

Sources

External links 

2015 Vuelta a España
Vuelta a España stages